Duzulla is a genus of moths of the family Crambidae. It contains only one species, Duzulla subhyalinalis, which is found in Syria, Jordan and India.

References

Spilomelinae
Monotypic moth genera
Moths of Asia
Crambidae genera
Taxa named by Hans Georg Amsel